The Movie Masters is an American television panel game show that ran from August 2, 1989, to January 19, 1990. It was the last game show hosted by Gene Rayburn and aired as filler programming on the American Movie Classics (AMC) cable network.

The regular panel of the show consisted of veteran New York Times movie and theatre critic Clive Barnes and longtime To Tell the Truth panelists Kitty Carlisle and Peggy Cass.

Game play
At the start of each episode, the announcer would introduce Cass, who in turn introduced Barnes, on through to Carlisle and Rayburn, the last of whom was escorted out by the hostess. (This conceit had previously been used on What's My Line?)

The goal of the game was to identify a famous movie scene hidden behind a 3-by-3 puzzle board. Each puzzle piece included a movie-related question, identified by a category; the question often involved "fill-in-the-blank" movie quotes similar to Rayburn's previous game show Match Game. Correctly answering a question revealed that piece of the puzzle; two incorrect answers in a category eliminated that piece from being chosen again and kept it permanently hidden (as the show only prepared two questions for each category). Winning the game (by correctly guessing the movie scene) earned a prize package for a home viewer, the size of which depended on how many questions the winning panelist had answered correctly.

Each panelist was addressed in sequence in lieu of a buzzer system; the panelist would be given the opportunity to answer each question before either of the other panelists were called upon.

References

Sources 
 Brian Donlon, Vintage movies woo a bored audience, August 1, 1989, USA Today
 THERE'S SOMETHING FUNNY ABOUT CABLE'S PLANS FOR FALL, July 18, 1989, Buffalo News

External links
 The Movie Masters on IMDb

1980s American game shows
1990s American game shows
1989 American television series debuts
1990 American television series endings
Panel games
AMC (TV channel) original programming
American motion picture television series